Arquà may refer to:

Arquà Petrarca, a commune in Padua, Italy
Arquà Polesine, a commune in Rovigo, Italy